Cyperus megalanthus is a species of sedge that is native to southern parts of North America and parts of Central America.

See also 
 List of Cyperus species

References 

megalanthus
Plants described in 1994
Flora of Mexico
Flora of Guatemala